Lerna Ekmekçioğlu is a historian and author of Turkish–Armenian origin. She is a faculty member at MIT. She works on the history of Armenians and Turks in the 20th century.

Works

References

Turkish people of Armenian descent
MIT School of Humanities, Arts, and Social Sciences faculty
Writers from Istanbul
Turkish emigrants to the United States
Year of birth missing (living people)
Living people
Historians of Turkey
21st-century Turkish  historians